Severe Cyclonic Storm Agni was a tropical cyclone of the 2004 North Indian Ocean cyclone season notable for its record proximity to the equator. It was the second North Indian Ocean cyclone to receive a name, after Onil earlier in the year. Agni formed on November 28 well to the southwest of India in the Arabian Sea, and steadily intensified as it tracked northwestward. After peaking, it weakened due to wind shear, dry air, and cooler waters, and the JTWC issued its final advisory on December 3 as it approached the coast of Somalia. The remnants of Agni moved along the Somalian coastline until dissipating on December 5.



Meteorological history

A tropical disturbance was observed on November 19 about 800 km (500 mi) southeast of Colombo, Sri Lanka in the Bay of Bengal. The disturbance tracked westward, gradually organizing and prompting the JTWC to issue a Tropical Cyclone Formation Alert (TCFA) on November 22. After passing south of Sri Lanka, it became disorganized and was no longer considered likely to develop into a tropical cyclone. The circulation associated with the system continued westward, reorganizing on November 26 in the Arabian Sea. Despite being located unusually close to the equator, the disturbance maintained convection, or thunderstorms, which was becoming organized around the weak low-level circulation. With low wind shear and diffluence aloft, the JTWC remarked the system had a fair chance of developing.

While the system was organizing, the center crossed the equator to reach about 0.5° S, thus becoming an anticyclonic circulation in the southern hemisphere. This was unusual, as the Coriolis effect is nonexistent along the equator—the Coriolis effect refers to planetary vorticity, which provides the spin in a cyclone. The JTWC later assessed the system as remaining in the northern hemisphere, reaching as far south as 0.7° N, or about 80 km (50 mi) from the equator. After the circulation organized further beneath the convection, the JTWC issued another TCFA at 0300 UTC on November 28. Three hours later, the agency classified the system as Tropical Cyclone 05A about 1300 km (800 mi) southwest of the southern tip of India. In a post-season analysis, the JTWC estimated the cyclone became a tropical storm six hours earlier. At around the same time, the IMD classified it as a "low-pressure area... likely to become well marked."

Upon being classified, the tropical cyclone was moving northwestward under the influence of a ridge over India. Its outflow to the north and south became better defined, although its proximity to the equator limited its southerly outflow somewhat due to wind shear. Early on November 29, the IMD classified the system as a depression, and throughout the day it rapidly intensified to become a cyclonic storm; a cyclonic storm is a tropical cyclone with at least  winds sustained for 3 minutes. Late on November 29, the cyclone weakened slightly, only to regain its peak intensity by November 30; at that time, it developed a banding eye, and was located about 1500 km (900 mi) southeast of the coast of Somalia. At its peak, the cyclone had a barometric pressure of 985 mbar.

After reaching peak intensity, an increase in wind shear caused the eye to disappear, and the convection decreased significantly. On December 1, the IMD estimated Agni weakened to cyclonic storm status, around which time the center became exposed from the convection. The cyclone continued its steady weakening continued due to the wind shear, the presence of dry air, and cooler water temperatures, and by December 2, the IMD downgraded Agni to depression status, which was its final warning on the system. As it approached the coast of Somalia, it turned westward due to the building of a ridge over Saudi Arabia. Despite unfavorable conditions, thunderstorms briefly reformed over the circulation, which allowed the storm to maintain its intensity. By late on December 3, Agni weakened to below tropical storm status, and the JTWC issued its final warning while the storm was about 450 km (275 mi) south-southeast of Cape Guardafui—the easternmost point of the Horn of Africa. The circulation became difficult to locate by early on December 4, by which time the system had little remaining convection. It turned southwestward and later to the south, moving ashore on eastern Somalia before dissipating on December 5 near Ceel Huur over water.

Records, naming, and impact
According to RSMC New Delhi, Cyclone Agni developed into a depression at 1.5° N, which is the same latitude as where according to RSMC Tokyo, Tropical Storm Vamei formed during December 2001. However, according to RSMC La Réunion, the precursor low to Cyclone Agni briefly moved into the Southern Hemisphere and kept its anticyclonic counter-clockwise circulation.

Agni was the second storm in the north Indian Ocean to receive a name, after the IMD began tropical cyclone naming in the middle of 2004.

Since the cyclone was weak when it moved over Somalia, no casualties or significant damage was reported.

See also

List of near-Equatorial tropical cyclones
List of tropical cyclones

References

Agni
Agni
Agni
Agni